Henry Dargan McMaster (born May 27, 1947) is an American politician and attorney serving as the 117th governor of South Carolina since 2017. He served as the 91st lieutenant governor of South Carolina from 2015 to 2017 under governor Nikki Haley and became governor upon Haley's resignation on January 24, 2017. He is a member of the Republican Party.

McMaster worked for U.S. senator Strom Thurmond, both in private practice and as a federal prosecutor. Appointed United States attorney for the District of South Carolina by President Ronald Reagan in 1981, he gained attention for investigating South Carolina marijuana smugglers in Operation Jackpot. McMaster was the Republican nominee for U.S. Senate in South Carolina in 1986,  losing to incumbent Democrat Fritz Hollings. He was then defeated for lieutenant governor of South Carolina by Democrat Nick Theodore in 1990.

McMaster chaired the South Carolina Republican Party from 1993 to 2002. He was elected attorney general of South Carolina in 2002 and reelected in 2006. In 2010, McMaster ran for governor but lost to Nikki Haley in the Republican primary. In 2011, Haley appointed him to the South Carolina Ports Authority. McMaster was then elected lieutenant governor of South Carolina under Haley's governorship in 2014. McMaster succeeded to the office of governor in 2017, when Haley resigned to become the United States ambassador to the United Nations. He won a full four-year term in the 2018 gubernatorial election after narrowly winning a runoff for the Republican nomination and defeating Democratic nominee James E. Smith Jr. in the general election. He won reelection against Democratic nominee Joe Cunningham in 2022.

Early life
McMaster was born on May 27, 1947, in Columbia, South Carolina. He is the eldest son of John Gregg and Ida Dargan (Pet) McMaster. He received a bachelor's degree in history from the University of South Carolina in 1969, and was a member of the Kappa Alpha Order fraternity. In 1973, he graduated from the University of South Carolina School of Law, where he served on the editorial board of the South Carolina Law Review. Later that year, he was admitted to the Richland County Bar Association of the South Carolina Bar. He served in the United States Army Reserves, receiving an honorable discharge in 1975.

Upon graduation from law school, McMaster worked as a legislative assistant to U.S. senator Strom Thurmond in Washington, D.C., until 1974, when he joined the firm of Tompkins and McMaster. He was admitted to practice before the federal Court of Claims in 1974, before the U.S. Court of Appeals for the Fourth Circuit in 1975, and upon Thurmond's motion, before the Supreme Court of the United States in 1978. McMaster practiced law for almost 29 years, both as a federal prosecutor and in private practice, representing clients in the state and federal courts, trial and appellate.

On April 13, 1993, Thurmond's 22-year-old daughter Nancy was killed by a drunk driver while jaywalking in Columbia, South Carolina. The driver, Corinne Koenig, immediately phoned McMaster, her attorney, and he was present at the scene as Nancy Thurmond was transported to the hospital. After learning the victim's identity, McMaster realized he had a conflict of interest and withdrew from the case.

Early political career

United States attorney
Upon Thurmond's recommendation, President Ronald Reagan nominated McMaster as United States Attorney for the District of South Carolina in 1981—Reagan's first nomination for U.S. attorney. The Senate confirmed McMaster on May 21, 1981. He headed the South Carolina Law Enforcement Coordinating Committee from 1981 to 1985.

During his tenure, McMaster created the federal drug task force Operation Jackpot to investigate South Carolina marijuana smugglers. Operation Jackpot ultimately arrested more than 100 people for crimes related to marijuana and hashish trafficking. McMaster held numerous press conferences during the operation and gained publicity through interviews and comments. His actions were criticized as political, with journalist Lee Bandy writing, "no one can recall any other U.S. attorney being so public-relations conscious" and noting that McMaster had held more press conferences and news releases than all his predecessors combined. McMaster completed his term as U.S. attorney on December 31, 1985.

Election bids and state appointments
In 1986, after considering races for South Carolina lieutenant governor and attorney general, McMaster won the spirited Republican primary for the United States Senate against Henry Jordan, 27,696 votes (53.4%) to 24,164 (46.6%). McMaster lost the general election in a landslide to four-term Democratic incumbent Ernest Hollings, 463,354 votes (63.1%) to 261,394 (35.6%). He only managed to carry Lexington County.

In 1990, McMaster ran for lieutenant governor. He defeated Sherry Shealy Martschink in the Republican primary, 49,463 votes (51.46%) to 46,660 (48.54%), but again lost to the Democratic incumbent. He received 309,038 votes (41.19%) to Nick Theodore's 440,844 (58.75%).

In 1991, Governor Carroll A. Campbell Jr. appointed McMaster to the state's Commission on Higher Education, and the South Carolina Senate confirmed him. He also served on the board of directors of the nonprofit South Carolina Policy Council from 1991 to 2003, serving as board chairman from 1992 to 1993. McMaster left the Ports Authority in 2015.

South Carolina Republican Party chair
On May 8, 1993, McMaster was elected chairman of the South Carolina Republican Party. He was reelected by the State Republican Convention in 1996, 1998 and 2000. In this capacity, he also served as a member of the Republican National Committee from 1993 to 2002. Under McMaster's chairmanship, the Republican Party captured the governorship, several statewide offices and (with party switches) the State House of Representatives in 1994, and finally captured control of the powerful State Senate in 2000. Under McMaster, the South Carolina GOP also ran highly contentious and successful presidential primaries in 1996 (won by Bob Dole) and 2000 (won by George W. Bush). On March 28, 2002, McMaster announced his resignation as party chairman so that he could run for attorney general.

Attorney General of South Carolina

McMaster placed first in the Republican primary for attorney general, with 126,164 votes (42.41%), ahead of State Senator and former judge Larry Richter and attorney Jon E. Ozmint. He defeated Richter in the runoff, 162,014 votes (55.8%) to 128,271 (44.2%). In the general election, McMaster defeated Democratic attorney and former director of the South Carolina Department of Probation, Parole and Pardon Services Stephen K. Benjamin, 601,931 votes (55.5%) to 482,560 (44.5%). He was reelected in 2006, unopposed in both the Republican primary and the general election.

Run for governor; Ports Authority
In 2010 McMaster ran for governor, but finished third in the Republican primary with 71,187 votes (16.94%), ahead of Lieutenant Governor André Bauer's 52,324 (12.45%) but behind U.S. representative Gresham Barrett's 91,461 (21.76%) and state representative Nikki Haley's 205,360 (48.86%). He immediately endorsed Haley, who had been the front-runner throughout the race and defeated Barrett in the runoff by a landslide.

In 2011, Haley appointed McMaster to the South Carolina Ports Authority, succeeding Harry Butler Jr. and was replaced by Kurt D. Grindstaff.

Campaign finance violation
On January 6, 2015, the Ethics Commission of South Carolina accused McMaster of accepting about $70,000 in donations to his 2010 campaign for governor, exceeding South Carolina's limit for donations by $51,850. The commission released documents stating that McMaster accepted these extra funds to help settle campaign debt. In September 2015, the commission refused to dismiss the complaint and McMaster's attorney indicated McMaster was likely to settle. In March 2016, the commission ordered McMaster "to repay $72,700 in excess campaign contributions from his 2010 run for governor and pay a $5,100 fine."

Lieutenant Governor of South Carolina
McMaster filed to run for lieutenant governor of South Carolina on March 27, 2014. He received 44% of the vote in a four-way Republican Party primary, forcing a runoff between him and Mike Campbell, son of former governor Carroll A. Campbell Jr. McMaster defeated Campbell with 63.6% of the vote and faced Democratic state representative Bakari Sellers in the general election. During the campaign, Sellers challenged McMaster to renounce his 30-year membership in Columbia's Forest Lake Country Club, a private country club alleged to exclude black members; in response, McMaster's campaign manager said that the club "[had] no policies of racial discrimination" and that McMaster "would not be a member if it did." On November 4, 2014, McMaster was elected lieutenant governor with 58.8% of the vote. Upon his inauguration, he succeeded Democrat Yancey McGill.

McMaster was elected on a separate ticket from Governor Haley, the last time a lieutenant governor was elected in this manner; as of 2018, candidates for governor and lieutenant governor run on the same ticket. During the 2016 presidential campaign, McMaster was an early and avid supporter of Donald Trump. He claimed to be the first elected politician in the United States to support Trump. After Trump won the Republican nomination, McMaster delivered the nominating speech at the Republican National Convention.

Governor of South Carolina

Elections

On November 23, 2016, President-elect Donald Trump announced his intention to nominate Haley as Ambassador to the United Nations. On January 24, 2017, the Senate confirmed Haley. Later that day, she resigned as governor and McMaster assumed the governorship. Inaugurated at the age of 69 years and 8 months, McMaster is the oldest person ever to assume the office of governor in South Carolina. McMaster served the remainder of Haley's term, which expired in January 2019. Per the South Carolina constitution, McMaster is eligible to serve as governor until January 2027 if he is reelected in 2022. Before ascending to the office of governor, McMaster declared in September 2016 that he would run in the 2018 election. McMaster won the 2018 election to serve his first four-year term.

After McMaster's first year as governor, The State evaluated his performance. It praised him for adding 17,000 jobs in the state, his accessibility to state legislators, and his handling of Hurricane Irma in 2017, but criticized his "lack of leadership", citing as an example his veto of a gas-tax increase that would have paid for road repairs and replacements for aging school buses, which members of both parties slammed, including McMaster's gubernatorial primary rival Catherine Templeton. The State summed up McMaster's first year as "mixed".

2018

On June 12, 2018, McMaster placed first in the Republican gubernatorial primary, with 155,072 votes. But since that was 42.3% of the vote, less than a majority, he faced John Warren in a runoff. On June 26, McMaster won the runoff with over 53% of the vote. McMaster chose businesswoman Pamela Evette as his running mate, not incumbent lieutenant governor Kevin L. Bryant, who ran against McMaster for the gubernatorial nomination. Trump endorsed McMaster. McMaster defeated Democratic nominee James Smith in the general election with 54% of the vote.

2022

McMaster secured the Republican nomination in the June 14 primary. He defeated the Democratic nominee, Joe Cunningham, in the general election.

Tenure

Richard Quinn corruption investigation
In 2017, McMaster, the University of South Carolina, BlueCross BlueShield, Columbia Mayor Steve Benjamin, and a number of prominent state legislators were connected to Richard Quinn and Associates, a firm he employed for political consulting. Richard Quinn and Associates was named as part of a larger corruption probe Special Prosecutor David Pascoe conducted within the South Carolina General Assembly, which first ensnared then-Speaker Bobby Harrell, who resigned and pleaded guilty to public corruption charges in 2014. McMaster has not been implicated in Pascoe's corruption probe, but four state legislators have been indicted as part of it as of May 2017.

McMaster's connections to Richard Quinn and Associates caused him challenges in the South Carolina legislature when replacing two members of the South Carolina Ports Authority (SCPA) Board of Directors whose terms had expired. At the time of McMaster's replacement nominations, the SCPA paid Quinn a consulting fee of $8,100 per month. State lawmakers delayed the vote on McMaster's two nominees for two weeks, citing the ongoing corruption probe that had pulled in three Republican legislators. Both nominees were confirmed after the SCPA voted to cease employing Quinn. McMaster likewise ceased to use Quinn in advance of his 2018 gubernatorial campaign.

Nukegate 

McMaster was in office when it was announced that SCANA and Santee Cooper were abandoning the expansion of the Virgil C. Summer Nuclear Generating Station in 2017. The event has been nicknamed the Nukegate scandal. Following the retirement of Santee Cooper's chairman, McMaster appointed Charlie Condon as a replacement. McMaster favors the sale of the utility, which he has called a "rogue agency" due to its independence and financial problems.

COVID-19 pandemic

Like most governors during the COVID-19 pandemic in the United States in 2020, McMaster declared a state of emergency. On April 20, 2020, McMaster drew criticism for reopening beaches and retail stores five days after South Carolina experienced its highest number of new positive COVID-19 tests, but he did include additional social distancing requirements in his executive order. McMaster said the economy was stalled because of the pandemic and that he anticipated having the economy "humming" by June 2020. By early June, McMaster reopened the majority of the state, though schools remained closed and businesses were required to follow social distancing procedures. Many schools and universities across the country canceled graduation ceremonies, but McMaster urged South Carolina schools to hold ceremonies in a manner that abided by social distancing requirements. He delivered the commencement address at West Florence High School's graduation ceremony and sang "Mull of Kintyre" while playing his guitar.

On June 10, state epidemiologist Linda Bell said that COVID-19 was worse in June than it was when the state was closed in March and April. On average, the number of cases in early June was five to six times higher than in March and April. McMaster said, "it is up to the people to determine what kind of precautions need to be followed," indicating that he would not place any more restrictions on businesses and public facilities. Bell accused McMaster of intentionally misleading the public about her stance on reopening the economy; she claimed that his staff was "somewhat manipulative" and made it appear that she and other scientists backed his plan to reopen the economy when she did not.

By late June and early July, confirmed cases in South Carolina had risen by as much as 2,000% compared to March and April. Despite pleas from lawmakers and other state officials, McMaster declined to enact a statewide requirement to wear masks, saying that such an order would be unenforceable. Consequently, dozens of municipalities enacted their own mask requirement ordinances, including Columbia, Forest Acres, Greenville, Charleston, Lexington, and most large cities and towns. Bell criticized McMaster's decision and said a statewide mask requirement would be more effective. McMaster responded that a statewide requirement would give a “false sense of security to South Carolinians." Attorney General Alan Wilson noted that ordinances and laws requiring masks are not illegal. On July 10, as the state's COVID-19 cases exceeded 50,000 and nearly 900 deaths, McMaster issued an executive order prohibiting businesses from selling alcohol after 11 p.m. in an effort to prevent the spread of the virus among younger people.

On July 15, McMaster said in an address that South Carolina schools should give parents the option to send students to in-person classes in September 2020. He instructed Superintendent of Education Molly Spearman to reject any school's reopening plan if it did not allow in-person learning. Groups such as the Palmetto State Teachers Association, the S.C. Education Association, and SC for Ed criticized McMaster's order, saying that it "would needlessly jeopardize the health and safety of our state’s 800,000 students and more than 50,000 teachers." Several school districts, including Greenville County School District, the state's largest, denounced the order. Spearman, a Republican elected independently of McMaster, also disapproved of his order.

On July 29, McMaster signed an executive order requiring face masks for employees and patrons in all South Carolina restaurants and bars and prohibiting any restaurant from operating at more than 50% capacity, seating tables less than six feet apart, or allowing people to congregate at a bar. By October, McMaster lifted most restrictions and unveiled SC CARES Act grants, a $65 million program aimed at helping small businesses and minority-owned businesses affected by COVID-19.

On December 22, the governor's office announced that McMaster and wife had both tested positive for COVID-19.

In 2021, McMaster said he would block the federal government from sending people door-to-door to promote vaccinations. In September 2021, he criticized federal vaccine requirements, saying, "Biden and the radical Democrats [have] thumbed their noses at the Constitution." McMaster pledged to fight Biden "to the gates of hell" over the vaccine requirement.

2020 protests and riots

In response to the murder of George Floyd, protests flared across the United States. In South Carolina, protests occurred in Columbia, Greenville, and Charleston. While protests in Greenville were largely peaceful, there were some instances of violence in Columbia and Charleston. In Columbia, police cars were torched, shots were fired at police, and businesses were vandalized. In Charleston, protesters stopped traffic on Interstate-26 and the Arthur Ravenel Jr. Bridge and vandalized and looted businesses. Like President Trump, McMaster said that state and local governments were being too lenient on rioters and looters and was critical of Charleston's initial response. He said to Trump, "We've got to take people out, give them justice, make it more than just the cost of doing business to come into one town, get arrested, pay bond." McMaster mobilized the South Carolina National Guard to be dispatched, if necessary, to halts riots and looting. At Trump's request, he also sent members of the National Guard to Washington, D.C. to aid in larger-scale protests.

Adams v. Henry McMaster
McMaster is a longtime advocate of private education. In 2020, as part of the Governor's Emergency Education Relief (GEER) and the CARES Act, federal funds were distributed to support education in states amid the COVID-19 pandemic. McMaster announced that he sought to use $32 billion, or two thirds, of South Carolina's $48 billion allotment on private school vouchers, and that 5,000 grants to private schools would be made with the federal relief money. His decision received harsh criticism from educators and politicians around the state. The Palmetto State Teachers Association stated that the money could have been better used for South Carolina's nearly 1,000,000 students in public education instead of 5,000 students in private schools. SC for Ed, a teachers' advocacy group, called the decision "disappointing."

McMaster's supporters argued that parents should have a choice about where to send their children. On July 22, 2020, McMaster's decision was halted by court order after educators sued him for failing to uphold a principle of the South Carolina Constitution: "No money shall be paid from public funds nor shall the credit of the State or any of its political subdivisions be used for the direct benefit of any religious or other private educational institution." McMaster's attorneys argued that the decision to use emergency funds for private schools should be decided by the voters or the South Carolina General Assembly, not a court order. On October 7, in the case Adams v. Henry McMaster, the South Carolina Supreme Court unanimously struck down McMaster's decision, citing a violation of the state constitution. On October 23, McMaster filed a petition to the court to review the ruling.

Kidnapping plot allegations

On October 8, 2020, a federal indictment against six men associated with the Wolverine Watchmen, a Michigan-based militia group, was unsealed. The indictment charges the men with plotting to kidnap Michigan governor Gretchen Whitmer and violently overthrow Michigan's government. A search warrant unsealed on October 28 revealed that the suspects had also discussed targeting McMaster during the early stages of their planning. One of the suspects was arrested in Columbia at the time the plot was uncovered, but there was no indication that he had plans of going after McMaster.

Veto record

As of March 2023, McMaster has signed over 600 bills, vetoed 28, and had 19 overridden.

Political positions

Abortion
McMaster opposes abortion. On February 18, 2021, he signed a bill into law that would ban most abortions. The next day, a federal judge suspended the law until June 2022. After the U.S. Supreme Court overturned Roe v. Wade, McMaster said he "looks forward to the day we don’t have abortions," and that he would sign any anti-abortion bill that came across his desk.

Fiscal policies

On February 6, 2017, McMaster's first major action as governor was to request $5.18 billion from President Trump for South Carolina's infrastructure. Trump made no public statement about McMaster's request. Later in February, McMaster announced, "[the] state government is going to have to go on a diet as far as spending." On May 9, 2017, McMaster vetoed a bill that would have raised the state's gas tax by 12 cents—the largest tax increase in state history—but the South Carolina General Assembly overrode his veto the following day. McMaster said the state had "plenty of money in the system to do all the work on the roads if we would just apply it to the roads that need the work...It's not necessary to put yet another tax on the people of South Carolina."

Guns
McMaster has said he would sign legislation, if passed by the General Assembly, that "would allow anyone who is legally allowed to buy a gun to do so without a state permit and carry it openly or concealed." When students did a walkout to protest gun violence and call for stricter gun control a month after the Stoneman Douglas High School shooting, McMaster called the walkout "shameful" and said it was a "tricky move" orchestrated by "left-wing groups" that were using the students as "tools" to further their agenda. Student activist David Hogg, who survived the Parkland shooting, criticized McMaster, saying in a tweet that "future voters will not reelect you and outlive you too."

Immigration
In 2018, McMaster offered to send troops from the South Carolina National Guard to assist Texas in combating illegal immigration and drug trafficking. This came after Trump called for the deployment of thousands of soldiers along the Mexico–United States border, in which border states such as Arizona and New Mexico also participated.

LGBT rights 
In 1993, as chair of the South Carolina Republican Party, McMaster criticized a bill cosponsored by Senator Fritz Hollings, a Democrat, that would prohibit workplace discrimination based on sexual orientation. McMaster said, "I want to know why he sponsored the gay-rights bill that allows homosexuals to be recruited to teach in schools, among other things." In 2006, as Attorney General, McMaster successfully led the fight to ban same-sex marriage in South Carolina. He also said that South Carolina should "secede" over Don't Ask, Don't Tell. In an October 2022 gubernatorial debate, McMaster said he would enforce a same-sex marriage ban in South Carolina if the U.S. Supreme Court overturned Obergefell v. Hodges.

Personal life

Family 
McMaster has been married to Peggy McMaster (née Anderson) since 1978. They have two adult children and reside in Columbia, South Carolina. He owns an English Bulldog named Mac. McMaster and his family attend First Presbyterian Church in Columbia.

Properties
McMaster and his wife own several houses and rental apartments in the Columbia area. One home they own is the McCord House, which was constructed in 1849 and used as a Union headquarters during the Civil War. McMaster typically leases or rents these homes to University of South Carolina students; they are his largest source of income. According to the Post and Courier, tenants have complained that the properties are unsafe and unsanitary. Images of roaches, outdated utilities, mold, bedbugs, mice, and bats validated the claim. Tenants have also complained about mold and having to wait months for pest control. When asked about the issues, McMaster denied the homes were unfit for renting. A spokeswoman for his campaign said, "Of course they are livable. No one would rent them if they were not." In 2016, McMaster's tax return showed that he received $7.7 million in rent on such houses and apartments between 2006 and 2015; he paid a little over $500,000 for upkeep, maintenance, and cleaning. McMaster has also reportedly paid over $16,000 in fines for ordinance violations. He has suggested that the fines were accrued because tenants trashed the properties.

Electoral history

McMaster ran unsuccessfully for the U.S. Senate in 1986, for lieutenant governor in 1990, and for governor in 2010. He was elected attorney general in 2002 and 2006, lieutenant governor in 2014, and governor in 2018.

Notes

References

External links

 Governor of South Carolina
 Henry McMaster for Governor
 
 
 2023 Swearing in of Governor McMaster and Constitutional Officers on WLTX-TV
 2023 Swearing in of Governor McMaster and Constitutional Officers on South Carolina Educational Television
 2023 Inaugural Ball - 98th South Carolina Inaugural on South Carolina Educational Television
 2023 Inaugural Prayer Service on South Carolina Educational Television
 2019 Swearing in of Governor McMaster and Constitutional Officers on South Carolina Educational Television
 2017 Swearing in of Governor McMaster upon appointment of Governor Nikki Haley to the United Nations on South Carolina Educational Television

|-

|-

|-

|-

|-

|-

|-

|-

|-

|-

|-

|-

1947 births
20th-century American lawyers
21st-century American politicians
American Presbyterians
Republican Party governors of South Carolina
Lawyers from Columbia, South Carolina
Lieutenant Governors of South Carolina
Living people
Politicians from Columbia, South Carolina
South Carolina Attorneys General
South Carolina lawyers
State political party chairs of South Carolina
United States Attorneys for the District of South Carolina
University of South Carolina School of Law alumni